The masseteric fascia (parotideomasseteric fascia) is a strong layer of fascia derived from the deep cervical fascia on the human head and neck. It covers the masseter, and is firmly connected to it. Above, this fascia is attached to the lower border of the zygomatic arch, and behind, it invests the parotid gland proceeding into the parotid fascia.

References 

Fascial spaces of the head and neck